Colombia first formally participated at the Olympic Games in 1932, and has sent athletes to compete in all but one edition of the Summer Olympic Games since then, missing only the 1952 Games.  
Colombian athletes have won a total of 34 Olympic medals (five gold, thirteen silver and sixteen bronze) in eight different sports, with weightlifting and cycling as the most successful ones. Colombia is the third most successful South American country at the Olympic Games, after Brazil and Argentina respectively. The Colombian Olympic Committee was created in 1936 and recognised by the International Olympic Committee in 1948.

Shooter Helmut Bellingrodt won the country's first olympic medal, a silver at the Munich 1972 Olympics. Weightlifter María Isabel Urrutia became in the first Olympic champion representing the country at the Sydney Olympics in 2000. BMX rider Mariana Pajón is the most successful Colombian olympian, with two golds and one silver.

History 

One Colombian national, Francisco Henríquez de Zubiría, competed at the 1900 Summer Olympics before the advent of rules tying all participants to National Olympic Committees. Henríquez de Zubiría was born in and lived in Paris and competed for a French club in the tug of war event, and is often listed as competing for France. The IOC currently lists this team as silver medalists under the mixed team designation.

A Colombian delegation attended the Olympic Games for the first time in the 1932 Summer Games in Los Angeles, with only one athlete: Jorge Perry. Perry sent a letter to the International Olympic Committee in January 1932 in which he introduces himself; described Colombia as "a little South American country aiming to grow its sporting structure and willing to be part of the olympic movement", and expressing his desire to take part in the then upcoming competition. The following month, Perry received an answer from the IOC. Fearful of being rejected, he slowly opened the letter. But surprisingly for him his request not only was accepted, but also help was offered for him before and during competition. On July 30, 1932, he paraded in the opening ceremony representing a country not affiliated to the IOC back then. He competed in the marathon, but after ten kilometers was unable to finish and the race was won by Argentina's Juan Carlos Zabala. Fourteen years later in 1946, Colombia's first olympian dies in Bogotá, 4 days after suffering a motorcycle accident near his native Samacá. For the 1936 edition of the Games, the Comité Olímpico Colombiano was already created and sent five athletes to compete in Berlin. After the controversial decision to replay a football match between Peru and Austria (after an adverse result for the Austrians), the Colombian delegation left the olympic village as a sign of support to the Peruvian team. After the conclusion of World War II, the 1948 London Olympics were held and the Colombian contingent for the first time included athletes from sports other than track and field, taking part in fencing and swimming. Due to financing problems and a then ongoing violent period, Colombia did not take part in the 1952 Helsinki Olympics. For the Melbourne Games in 1956, the Colombian team expanded from a few competitors to 26 athletes, sending cyclists and weightlifters for the first time. Colombian athletes continued participating at the Olympics since then without missing a Summer edition of the Games, sending females athletes to compete for the first time at the 1968 Summer Olympics held in Mexico City.

Colombia won their first olympic medals at the Munich Olympics in 1972, forty years after making its debut in the games. The first one was a silver medal won by shooter Helmut Bellingrodt in the 50 metre running target event, both Clemente Rojas and Alfonso Pérez won each one a bronze medal in boxing at those games too, bringing the medal tally for the Colombian delegation to a total of three medals.

Despite being a US historical ally, Colombia did not support the US-Led boycott of the 1980 Moscow Olympics. Initially the then President of Colombia Julio Turbay supported the boycott, but the then president of Comité Olímpico Colombiano Fidel Mendoza did not abide the president's order and gave green light to 23 Colombian athletes to participate. Competing in the 1984 Olympics in Los Angeles, shooter Helmut Bellingrodt won his second silver medal in the same event he won his first medal back in 1972, making him the first Colombian athlete to won two olympic medals; his medal was the only one the Colombian contingent won at those Games. At the 1988 Olympics in Seoul, another Colombian boxer won a bronze medal: Jorge Eliécer Julio made it to the Bantamweight category semifinals and faced Bulgaria's Aleksandar Khristov; the Colombian was seen as dominating his opponent, but in the end three out of five judges declared the Bulgarian as winner of the bout, prompting protests from fans who were attending the boxing competitions at that moment. Ximena Restrepo became the first Colombian woman to win an Olympic medal, by winning a bronze medal in the women's 400 m. at the 1992 Barcelona Olympics. She found out she won a medal minutes later after crossing the line. Her 49.64 seconds mark still stands as the South American record for that event. Ximena Restrepo became the first Colombian woman to win an Olympic medal, by winning a bronze medal in the women's 400 m. at the 1992 Barcelona Olympics. She found out she won a medal minutes later after crossing the line. Her 49.64 seconds mark still stands as the South American record for that event. The country failed to win a medal at the 1996 Centennial Olympics in Atlanta, although marathon runner Carlos Grisales ranked eleventh in the men's event, the highest position a Colombian athlete has ever achieved in an olympic marathon race so far. The story was different four years later in Sydney 2000, as Weightlifter María Isabel Urrutia won the nation's first olympic gold medal at the 75 kg. category. Urrutia lifted the same weight than silver and bronze medal winners Nigeria's Ruth Ogbeifo and Taiwan's Kuo Yi-hang respectively, but she won gold due her body weight being less than that of her rivals. Señal Colombia broadcast her victory and when the event ended, the narrators mistakenly believed she won bronze as they saw on screen the results of the clean and jerk phase. Seconds after, the final results were screened and they realized their error and Urrutia's accomplishment.

When the Olympic Games returned to Greece in Athens 2004, the Colombian delegation collected two bronze medals through weightlifter Mabel Mosquera and cyclist María Luisa Calle, who won Colombia's first olympic medal in Cycling. Calle was originally stripped of her medal after failing an antidoping test for heptaminol. She assured that hours before the race, she took an anti-migraine pill which contained isometheptene, a substance which transforms into heptaminol during laboratory analyses. The bronze medal she won in the women's points race was later returned, being one of a few cases in which IOC returned a medal stripped for doping. For the Beijing Olympics in 2008, the Colombian roster won two medals: weightlifter Diego Salazar won silver in the men's 62kg, and Jackeline Rentería won Colombia's first olympic medal in Wrestling, earning bronze in women's freestyle 55kg category. During a wave of retests in 2016, it was disclosed that original gold and bronze medalists in the women's weightlifting 69kg event failed an antidoping test; weightlifter Leidy Solís finished fourth in that event back in 2008. Later in January 2017 the disgraced aforementioned medalists were officially disqualified, meaning that Solís was upgraded to second place. She received her silver medal in December 2017. Colombia made its Winter Olympics debut in 2010 in Vancouver. US-born Swiss Skier Cynthia Denzler represented the country in the women's slalom and giant slalom. She ranked 51st in the slalom event. To participate at the 2012 Olympics, Colombia sent a delegation composed of 104 athletes; this was the first time a delegation exceeded one hundred participants. The performance of national athletes improved remarkably as well. The maximum number of medals won in one edition of the games was three, number reached at Munich 1972 and Beijing 2008. In London the Colombian contingent won eight medals in six different sports. BMX rider Mariana Pajón won Colombia's first golden medal since Sydney 2000. Cyclist Rigoberto Urán won silver in the men's road race, the first olympic medal in road cycling competitions for the country. Track and field athlete Caterine Ibargüen won silver in the women's triple jump, the first medal in Athletics since Barcelona 1992. Weightlifter Óscar Figueroa won also silver in the men's 62kg, setting an olympic record of 177 kg in the clean and jerk phase. Jackeline Rentería matched her performance in Beijing and won again a bronze medal, joining Helmut Bellingrodt as the only Colombian athletes to win two olympic medals. Carlos Oquendo also won bronze in the cycling men's bmx race, on the same day Pajón won gold in the women's race. The bronze medals won by Yuri Alvear in Judo and Óscar Muñoz Oviedo in Taekwondo, were the first olympic medals for Colombia in those sports. The Good Performance achieved in London 2012 continued and improved in Rio de Janeiro 2016. Competing at the first Olympic Games held in South America, Colombian athletes won three gold, two silver and three bronze medals, winning again a total of eight medals. Triple jump World champion Caterine Ibargüen won a gold medal in the women's event, the first olympic golden medal in Athletics for Colombia. Óscar Figueroa upgraded his silver medal to gold in the men's weightlifting 62kg category, keeping Colombia's good streak in Olympic Weightlifting since 2000 and becoming the first male Olympic champion for the country. Mariana Pajón became the first Colombian athlete to be Olympic gold medalist twice, as she won again the women's cycling bmx race. Judoka Yuri Alvear won silver in the women's 70kg event, improving her 2012 bronze medal. Ibargüen, Figueroa, Pajón and Alvear joined shooter Bellingrodt and wrestler Rentería as the only Colombian athletes to have won two Olympic Medals. Boxers Yuberjén Martínez and Ingrit Valencia won Colombia's first olympic medals in Boxing since Seoul 1988; Martínez won silver and Valencia earned bronze, making her the first Colombian female boxer to win an olympic medal. BMX rider Carlos Ramírez won bronze in the men's race. Weightlifter Luis Javier Mosquera originally finished fourth in the men's 69kg event, but was later awarded the bronze medal as original winner Kyrgyzstan's Izzat Artykov was disqualified after testing positive for the stimulant strychnine. After an absence of eight years, Colombia competed again at the Winter Olympics in 2018 in PyeongChang. The Colombian delegation was made up of athletes competing in alpine skiing, cross-country skiing and ice speed skating, becoming in the first Latin American country to compete in the latter.

At the rescheduled Tokyo 2020 Olympics, Colombia won four silver and one bronze medals. Mariana Pajón added silver to her two previous golden medals earned in BMX racing, achievement that made her the first Colombian sportsperson to win three olympic medals. Sandra Lorena Arenas became in the first race walker from the country to win an Olympic medal, as she ranked second in the women's 20 km. event.

Medal tables

Medals by Summer Games 
{| class="wikitable" style="text-align:center; font-size:90%;"
|-
!Games
!Athletes
|style="background:gold; width:4.5em; font-weight:bold;"|Gold
|style="background:silver; width:4.5em; font-weight:bold;"|Silver
|style="background:#cc9966; width:4.5em; font-weight:bold;"|Bronze
!style="width:4.5em; font-weight:bold;"|Total
!style="width:4.5em; font-weight:bold;"|Rank
|-
|align=left|  || 1 || 0 || 0 || 0 || 0 || –
|-
|align=left|  || 5 || 0 || 0 || 0 || 0 || –
|-
|align=left|  || 5 || 0 || 0 || 0 || 0 || –
|-
|align=left|  || colspan=6| did not participate
|-
|align=left|  || 26 || 0 || 0 || 0 || 0 || –
|-
|align=left|  || 16 || 0 || 0 || 0 || 0 || –
|-
|align=left|  || 20 || 0 || 0 || 0 || 0 || –
|-
|align=left|  || 44 || 0 || 0 || 0 || 0 || –
|-
|align=left|  || 59 || 0 || 1 || 2 || 3 || 31
|-
|align=left|  || 35 || 0 || 0 || 0 || 0 || –
|-
|align=left|  || 23 || 0 || 0 || 0 || 0 || –
|-
|align=left|  || 39 || 0 || 1 || 0 || 1 || 33
|-
|align=left|  || 40 || 0 || 0 || 1 || 1 || 46
|-
|align=left|  || 49 || 0 || 0 || 1 || 1 || 54
|-
|align=left|  || 48 || 0 || 0 || 0 || 0 || –
|-
|align=left|  || 44 || 1 || 0 || 0 || 1 || 50
|-
|align=left|  || 53 || 0 || 0 || 2 || 2 || 68
|-
|align=left|  || 67 || 0 || 2 || 1 || 3 || 59
|-
|align=left|  || 104 || 1 || 3 || 5 || 9 || 38
|-
|align=left|  || 147 || 3 || 2 || 3 || 8 || 23
|-
|align=left|  || 70 || 0 || 4 || 1 || 5' || 66
|-
|align=left|  || colspan=6; rowspan=3| future event|-
|align=left|  
|-
|align=left|  
|-
!colspan=2| Total !! 5 !! 13 !! 16 !! 34 !! 68
|}

 Medals by Winter Games 

 Medals by Sport 
 As of the 2020 Summer OlympicsColombia's most successful Olympic performances have been in weightlifting and cycling, with 2 gold in each.

 Medals by Gender 
 As of the 2020 Summer Olympics''

List of Medalists

Multiple medalists

See also
 :Category:Olympic competitors for Colombia
 Tropical nations at the Winter Olympics
 Colombia at the Paralympics
 Colombia at the Youth Olympics
 List of flag bearers for Colombia at the Olympics

References

External links